Dennis Hunter is an American writer.

Biography 
Born in Wiesbaden, West Germany, he grew up in Norman, Oklahoma, where he attended college.  In the 1990s, his short fiction appeared in the Church-Wellesley Review and other publications, and was included in the anthology Discontents. Hunter became better known for his nonfiction. During the late 1990s, his essays appeared in the New York Press and in the anthology Boys Like Us.  Hunter lived in New York City for two decades.

In recent years, Hunter's interest in the practice and study of Buddhism has grown.

Since 2004, he is studying Tibetan Buddhism with Dzogchen Ponlop Rinpoche, writes about Buddhism and teaches for Nalandabodhi. He participated to organize the U.S. visit of the 17th Karmapa Ogyen Trinley Dorje in 2008. He helped to edit “Rebel Buddha,” a book from Dzogchen Ponlop Rinpoche.

From 2009 until 2011, while living as a Buddhist monk at Gampo Abbey, a monastery in Canada where he studied with Pema Chödrön, he began to write extensively about meditation and spiritual practice. His spiritual writing has appeared in Bodhi magazine, and on his web site, One Human Journey. He is a founding member of Nalandabodhi New York.

In 2014 Hunter published the book You Are Buddha: A Guide to Becoming What You Are.

In 2017 Hunter published his second book The Four Reminders: A Simple Buddhist Guide to Living and Dying Without Regret, lauded by Kirkus Reviews as "A smart, eminently readable Buddhist guide to achieving an inner awakening.”

Works
(book) The Four Reminders: A Simple Buddhist Guide to Living and Dying Without Regret, Hunter, Dennis, Miami: CreateSpace, 2017.
(book) You Are Buddha: A Guide to Becoming What You Are, Hunter, Dennis, New York: One Human Journey, 2014.
(short story in) Discontents: New Queer Writers, Cooper, Dennis (ed.), New York: Amethyst Press, c1992.
(essay in) Boys Like Us: Gay Writers Tell Their Coming Out Stories, Patrick Merla (ed.), New York: Avon Books, 1996

References

External links
Dennis Hunter's web site: Dennis Hunter
Dennis Hunter's blog: One Human Journey

Year of birth missing (living people)
Living people
German emigrants to the United States
People from Wiesbaden
People from Norman, Oklahoma
Writers from Oklahoma
American short story writers
American gay writers
American male essayists
American male short story writers
American essayists
21st-century LGBT people